Jawahar Navodaya Vidyalaya, Puducherry or locally known as JNV Kalapet is a boarding, co-educational  school in Puducherry district of Puducherry U.T. in India. Navodaya Vidyalayas are funded by the Indian Ministry of Human Resources Development and administered  by Navodaya Vidyalaya Smiti, an autonomous body under the ministry. Navodaya Vidyalayas provide free education to talented children from Class VI to XII. Puducherry district is a coastal enclave within Tamil Nadu state.

History 
The school was established in 1986, and is a part of Jawahar Navodaya Vidyalaya schools. This school is administered and monitored by Hyderabad regional office of Navodaya Vidyalaya Smiti.

Admission 
Admission to JNV Puducherry at class VI level is made through selection test (JNVST) conducted by Navodaya Vidyalaya Smiti. The information about test is disseminated and advertised in district by the office of Puducherry district magistrate (Collector), who is also the chairperson of Vidyalya Management Committee (VMC).

Affiliations 
JNV Puducherry is affiliated to Central Board of Secondary Education with affiliation number 2940001.

See also 
 Jawahar Navodaya Vidyalaya, Yanam
 Jawahar Navodaya Vidyalaya, Karaikal
 Jawahar Navodaya Vidyalaya, Mahe
 List of JNV schools

References

External links 

 Official Website of JNV Puducherry 

High schools and secondary schools in Puducherry
Jawahar Navodaya Vidyalayas in Puducherry
Educational institutions established in 1986
1986 establishments in Pondicherry
Puducherry district